Reinheim is a town in the Darmstadt-Dieburg district, in Hesse, Germany.

International relations

Twin towns - Sister cities

Reinheim is twinned with:
 Licata, Italy (since 29.6.2001)
 Cestas, France (since 1982)
 Fürstenwalde (Spree), Germany (since 1989)
 Sanok, Poland (since 1991)

Districts

Reinheim consist of Reinheim, Spachbrücken, Ueberau, Georgenhausen and Zeilhard, there are three small housing areas called Hundertmorgen, Dilshofen and Orscheläcker. Orscheläcker is a part of Spachbrücken, Hundertmorgen and Dilshofen are not a part of Reinheim, but they affiliate magistrate Reinheim.

Transport
Reinheim has had a railway station since 1871 and bus.

Personalities 

 Julius Scriba (1848-1905), physician and botanist
 Julius Scriba  (1866-1937), pharmacist
 Wilhelm von Willich von Pöllnitz (1807-1887), administrative officer and deputy of the 1st and 2nd chamber of the provinces of the Grand Duchy of Hesse

References

Darmstadt-Dieburg
Grand Duchy of Hesse